José Alfonso Muñoz Muñoz (born 31 October 1961) is a Mexican politician. As of 2014 he served as Deputy of the LIX Legislature of the Mexican Congress representing Querétaro as an independent.

References

1961 births
Living people
Politicians from San Luis Potosí
People from Rioverde, San Luis Potosí
21st-century Mexican politicians
Deputies of the LIX Legislature of Mexico
Members of the Chamber of Deputies (Mexico) for Querétaro